"Looks Like Me" is a song by Australian singer and songwriter Dean Lewis. The song was released on 21 October 2021 as the lead single from Lewis' forthcoming second studio album, The Hardest Love (2022).
 
Speaking of the track, Lewis said the song is "inspired by a personal relationship", saying "It was just one of those relationships that never quite came together – no matter how much I wanted it to. One night on the phone, we were living in different cities, she told me she was hanging with a guy who looked like me". In retrospect, Lewis says he can look back on the experience with "a sense of humour" posing, "So you'd rather be with someone who looks like me – than the 'actual' me!"

Music video
The official video was filmed in Nashville with Director Tim Mattia.

Track listings

Charts

References

2021 singles
2021 songs
Dean Lewis songs
Songs written by Dean Lewis